Asine was a town of ancient Laconia. According to Strabo, it was situated between Amathus (a false reading for Psamathus) and Gythium. It was often under Spartan control. Polybius relates that Philip V of Macedon, in his invasion of Laconia, suffered a repulse before Asine (218 BCE), which appears from his narrative to have been near Gythium. Pausanias, in describing the same event as Polybius, says that Philip was repulsed before "Las", which originally stood on the summit of "Mount Asia". There can therefore be no doubt that the "Las" of Pausanias and the "Asine" of Polybius are the same place; and the resemblance between the names "Asia" and "Asine" probably led Polybius into the error of calling Las by the latter name; an error which was the more likely to arise, because Herodotus and Thucydides speak of the Messenian Asine as a town in Laconia, since Messenia formed a part of Laconia at the time when they wrote. The error of Polybius was perpetuated by Strabo and Stephanus of Byzantium. During the Roman period Asine belonged to Sparta although most of the other towns in the area were part of the Union of Free Laconians.

The site was resettled in 1451 as Skoutari. Its site is located near the modern Skoutari.

See also
 List of ancient Greek cities

References

Populated places in ancient Laconia
Former populated places in Greece
Cities in ancient Peloponnese